The "Marines' Hymn" is the official hymn of the United States Marine Corps, introduced by the first director of the USMC Band, Francesco Maria Scala. Its music originates from an 1867 work by Jacques Offenbach with the lyrics added by an anonymous author at an unknown time in the following years. Authorized by the Commandant of the Marine Corps in 1929, it is the oldest official song in the United States Armed Forces. The "Marines' Hymn" is typically sung at the position of attention as a gesture of respect. However, the third verse is also used as a toast during formal events, such as the birthday ball and other ceremonies.

History

Some lyrics were popular phrases before the song was written. The line "To the shores of Tripoli" refers to the First Barbary War, and specifically the Battle of Derna in 1805. After Lieutenant Presley O'Bannon and his Marines hoisted the American flag over the Old World for the first time, the phrase was added to the flag of the United States Marine Corps. "The Halls of Montezuma" refers to the Battle of Chapultepec on 12/13 September 1847 during the Mexican–American War, where a force of Marines stormed Chapultepec Castle. Strictly, the usage "Halls of Montezuma" is poetic license, as the building which the Marines stormed had been erected by the Spanish rulers of Mexico, more than two centuries after the Aztec Emperor Montezuma was overthrown. At the time of the assault, the fort was actually the newly founded Mexican Military Academy.  Prior to Mexican independence one of the Spanish viceroys had built a personal residence on the hill (1786).  However, in Aztec times Chapultepec Hill and its hot springs were a royal spa.

Marine Corps tradition maintains that the red stripe worn on the dress-blues trousers of officers and noncommissioned officers, and commonly known as the blood stripe commemorates the high number of Marine NCOs and officers killed storming the castle of Chapultepec in September 1847. As noted,

The music is from the "Gendarmes' Duet" (or the "bold gendarmes") from the revision in 1867 of the Jacques Offenbach opera Geneviève de Brabant, which debuted in Paris in 1859. Correspondence between Colonel Albert S. McLemore and Walter F. Smith (the second leader of the United States Marine Band) traces the tune:

The name of the opera and a part of the chorus was secured from Wallach and forwarded to Smith, who replied: 
 
John Philip Sousa once wrote:

The lyrics are also contained in the book Rhymes of the Rookies published in 1917. The author of these poems was W. E. Christian. The book is available online in several formats. It consists of a series of poems regarding military life prior to World War I.

Some websites, including the official USMC website, claim that the U.S. Marine Corps secured a copyright on the song either 19 August 1891 or 18 August 1919. U.S. Copyright Law prohibits copyrighting "any work of the United States Government", including subordinate agencies such as the Marine Corps, but allows them to hold "copyrights transferred to it by assignment, bequest, or otherwise". The Library of Congress asserts that the song was originally copyrighted in 1919 by The Leatherneck, which was started by off-duty US Marines in 1917 using a donation from the YMCA, and therefore might not be considered a "work of the United States Government".  (It does not state whether Leatherneck's copyright was ever transferred to the Marine Corps.) In addition, several composers do hold copyrights on different arrangements of the song. These copyrights cover only the specific arrangements and not the song as a whole. In 1929 the commandant of the Marine Corps authorized the three verses of the Marines' Hymn as the official version, but changed the fifth through eighth lines:

This older version can be heard in the 1951 film Halls of Montezuma. On 21 November 1942, Commandant Thomas Holcomb approved a change in the words of the first verse's fourth line from "On the land as on the sea" to "In the air, on land, and sea" to reflect the addition of aviation to the Corps' arsenal.

Western Illinois University uses the hymn prior to all football games. They are the only nonmilitary academy allowed to use the hymn. The university has had permission to use the official nickname, mascot, and hymn of the Corps since 1927.

Lyrics
From the Halls of Montezuma
To the shores of Tripoli;
We fight our country's battles
In the air, on land, and sea;
First to fight for right and freedom
And to keep our honor clean;
We are proud to claim the title
Of United States Marine.

Our flag's unfurled to every breeze
From dawn to setting sun;
We have fought in ev'ry clime and place
Where we could take a gun;
In the snow of far-off Northern lands
And in sunny tropic scenes;
You will find us always on the job
The United States Marines.

Here's health to you and to our Corps
Which we are proud to serve;
In many a strife we've fought for life
And never lost our nerve;
If the Army and the Navy
Ever look on Heaven's scenes;
They will find the streets are guarded
By United States Marines.

Extra verses
Various people over the years have written unofficial or semi-official extra verses to commemorate later battles and actions. For example, after U.S. military forces occupied Iceland in 1941 to guard it against possible occupation by Nazi Germany, this verse was written:

Again in nineteen forty-one, we sailed a north'ard course
And found beneath the midnight sun, the Viking and the Norse.
The Iceland girls were slim and fair, and fair the Iceland scenes,
And the Army found in landing there, the United States Marines.

See also

"The Song of the Marines"
Halls of Montezuma (film)
To the Shores of Tripoli
"The U.S. Air Force" (song)
"Anchors Aweigh"
"The Army Goes Rolling Along"
Semper Paratus (march)
Semper Supra (march)
Sporting clubs that use the tune for their respective club songs:
Australian Football
Adelaide Football Club – "The Pride of South Australia"
Perth Football Club
Werribee Football Club
Rugby League
Melbourne Storm – "We are the Mighty Melbourne storm"
Cantebury Bulldogs

References

Bibliography

Further reading
Collins, Ace. Songs Sung, Red, White, and Blue: The Stories Behind America's Best-Loved Patriotic Songs. HarperResource, 2003. 
London, Joshua E. Victory in Tripoli: How America's War with the Barbary Pirates Established the U.S. Navy and Shaped a Nation New Jersey: John Wiley & Sons, Inc., 2005.

External links

Marine Corps Theme performed as instrumental band march (.wav file)
Marine's Hymn Lyrics Information about the USMC hymn as well as other USMC history.
The Marine's Hymn Mystery More information about the musical authorship of the tune.
Rhymes of the Rookies: Sunny Side of Soldier Service by W. E. Christian Project Gutenberg eBook containing original poem.

Marine Hymn
Patriotic hymns
American military marches
United States Marine Corps lore and symbols
Works about the United States Marine Corps
American patriotic songs